The 2014 Southern Football League (SFL) premiership season was an Australian rules football competition staged across Southern Tasmania, Australia, over eighteen roster rounds and six finals series matches between 11 April and 13 September 2014.

The competition's major sponsor for the season was Worksafe Tasmania, Boag's Draught and Telstra.

From this season the Hobart Football Club, who had previously participated in the league from 1998-2008 rejoined the SFL after five seasons of participation in the Tasmanian State League.
With AFL Tasmania's decision to issue only one licence for a club to participate in the TSL from inner-city Hobart from 2014 onwards, the sport's governing body attempted to force a merger of Hobart and North Hobart Football Clubs to participate as Hobart City in the TSL. 
Hobart Football Club's members voted against the proposal in favour of rejoining the SFL and were duly accepted back into the competition. 
North Hobart also attempted to seek a return to the league but were advised that they would be unlikely to be accepted. 
As a prerequisite of rejoining the SFL, Hobart were banned from seeking the recruitment of other players within the league for a period of twelve months, with almost their entire senior list seeking to remain playing at state league level, the Tigers had only two players on the training track in the pre-season and after a crisis meeting in which the club was only two days away from going out of business, Hobart were able to garner enough players in order to field a senior and reserve grade side for the season.

Participating Clubs
Brighton Football Club
Claremont Football Club
Cygnet Football Club
Dodges Ferry Football Club
East Coast Bombers Football Club
Hobart Football Club
Huonville Lions Football Club
Lindisfarne Football Club
New Norfolk District Football Club
Sorell Football Club

2014 SFL Club Coaches
 Jamie Ling (Brighton)
 Kim Excell (Claremont)
 Matt Tyrrell (Cygnet)
 Brad Curran (Dodges Ferry)
 Brett Copping (East Coast)
 Steve Woods (Hobart)
 Sam Chivers (Huonville Lions)
 Adrian Goodwin (Lindisfarne)
 Jon Murray (New Norfolk)
 David Lewis (Sorell)

2014 SFL Leading Goalkickers
 Josh Hall (New Norfolk) – 112
 David Hunt (Claremont) – 72
 Zeke Gardam (New Norfolk) – 65
 Caden Wilson (New Norfolk) – 63
 Nathan Brown (Claremont) – 58
 Michael Thompson (New Norfolk) – 54

SFL Reserves Leading Goalkicker
 Kris Cashion (New Norfolk) – 98

SFL Under-18s Leading Goalkicker
 Jye County (New Norfolk) – 52

2014 Medal Winners
 Caden Wilson (New Norfolk) – William Leitch Medal (Seniors)
 Matthew Tringrove (Lindisfarne) – George Watt Medal (Reserves)
 Jake Foster (New Norfolk) – Lipscombe Medal (Under-18s)
 Nathan Ross (New Norfolk) – Gorringe-Martyn Medal (Best Player in SFL Grand Final)

SFL Reserves Grand Final
New Norfolk 11.9 (75) d Claremont 10.5 (65) at KGV Football Park

SFL Under-18's Grand Final
Dodges Ferry 11.4 (70) d New Norfolk 9.11 (65) at KGV Football Park

2014 SFL Ladder

Round 1
(Friday, 11 & Saturday, 12 April 2014) 
Lindisfarne 20.15 (135) d Hobart 5.12 (42) at TCA Ground (Night).*  
Sorell 16.11 (107) d Cygnet 12.4 (76) at Cygnet Oval. 
East Coast 19.10 (124) d Brighton 9.10 (64) at Pontville Oval. 
Dodges Ferry 14.7 (91) d Huonville Lions 12.13 (85) at Huonville Recreation Ground. 
Claremont 15.12 (102) d New Norfolk 9.8 (62) at Abbotsfield Park (Night).* 
Notes: Lindisfarne's home fixture against Hobart was switched to the TCA Ground and played on the Friday evening due to Anzac Park being made unavailable by Clarence City Council two days prior to the match. 
Claremont's home fixture against New Norfolk was played on the Saturday evening under lights for the first time.

Round 2
(Friday, 18 & Saturday, 19 April 2014) 
Hobart 14.20 (104) d Cygnet 10.11 (71) at TCA Ground (Good Friday). 
Claremont 15.17 (107) d Brighton 10.5 (65) at Pontville Oval (Good Friday). 
New Norfolk 29.17 (191) d Huonville Lions 6.8 (44) at Huonville Recreation Ground (Good Friday). 
Dodges Ferry 11.18 (84) d Sorell 7.10 (52) at Shark Park. 
East Coast 15.15 (105) d Lindisfarne 11.11 (77) at Triabunna Recreation Ground.

Round 3
(Saturday, 26 April 2014) 
Hobart 13.7 (85) d Sorell 11.9 (75) at Pembroke Park. 
East Coast 10.18 (78) d Cygnet 4.6 (30) at Kermandie Oval.* 
New Norfolk 18.21 (129) d Brighton 3.6 (24) at Boyer Oval. 
Claremont 16.13 (109) d Dodges Ferry 4.1 (25) at Abbotsfield Park. 
Lindisfarne 20.22 (142) d Huonville Lions 4.9 (33) at Anzac Park. 
Note: Cygnet played their home fixture at Kermandie Oval, the former home of Kermandie Football Club.

Round 4
(Saturday, 3 May 2014) 
New Norfolk 33.21 (219) d Cygnet 6.7 (43) at Boyer Oval. 
Lindisfarne 15.15 (105) d Sorell 6.10 (46) at Pembroke Park. 
Dodges Ferry 14.10 (94) d Brighton 8.11 (59) at Pontville Oval. 
East Coast 19.12 (126) d Huonville Lions 5.6 (36) at Lauderdale Oval. 
Claremont 21.17 (143) d Hobart 8.10 (58) at Abbotsfield Park (Night).

Round 5
(Saturday, 10 May 2014) 
New Norfolk 15.15 (105) d Lindisfarne 12.10 (82) at Anzac Park. 
Claremont 25.12 (162) d Cygnet 8.8 (56) at Cygnet Oval. 
Brighton 12.18 (90) d Sorell 7.10 (52) at Pontville Oval. 
Huonville Lions 14.20 (104) d Hobart 9.12 (66) at Huonville Recreation Ground. 
Dodges Ferry 12.10 (82) d East Coast 10.15 (75) at Triabunna Recreation Ground.

Round 6
(Saturday, 17 May 2014) 
Brighton 15.18 (108) d Hobart 11.14 (80) at TCA Ground. 
Claremont 11.12 (78) d Lindisfarne 10.9 (69) at Abbotsfield Park. 
New Norfolk 15.17 (107) d East Coast 9.10 (64) at Boyer Oval. 
Dodges Ferry 24.27 (171) d Cygnet 6.7 (43) at Shark Park. 
Huonville Lions 12.9 (81) d Sorell 6.10 (46) at Pembroke Park.

Round 7
(Saturday, 24 May 2014) 
East Coast 19.22 (136) d Hobart 11.14 (80) at Lauderdale Oval. 
Lindisfarne 10.15 (75) d Brighton 8.15 (63) at Pontville Oval. 
Cygnet 11.18 (84) d Huonville Lions 8.7 (55) at Cygnet Oval. 
Claremont 19.18 (132) d Sorell 13.5 (83) at Pembroke Park. 
New Norfolk 26.14 (170) d Dodges Ferry 7.16 (58) at Shark Park.

Round 8
(Saturday, 31 May 2014) 
Dodges Ferry 19.14 (128) d Hobart 8.6 (54) at TCA Ground. 
New Norfolk 22.25 (157) d Sorell 4.6 (30) at Pembroke Park. 
Lindisfarne 30.15 (195) d Cygnet 8.4 (52) at Anzac Park. 
Claremont 24.13 (157) d East Coast 9.5 (59) at Abbotsfield Park. 
Brighton 13.21 (99) d Huonville Lions 5.8 (38) at Pontville Oval.

Round 9
(Saturday, 14 June 2014) 
New Norfolk 28.19 (187) d Hobart 3.3 (21) at Boyer Oval. 
Brighton 15.16 (106) d Cygnet 9.9 (63) at Cygnet Oval. 
Lindisfarne 14.13 (97) d Dodges Ferry 11.8 (74) at Anzac Park. 
East Coast 17.14 (116) d Sorell 11.11 (77) at Triabunna Recreation Ground. 
Claremont 35.32 (242) d Huonville Lions 5.3 (33) at Huonville Recreation Ground.

Round 10
(Saturday, 21 June 2014) 
New Norfolk 17.20 (122) d Claremont 7.7 (49) at Boyer Oval. 
Lindisfarne 18.16 (124) d Hobart 6.13 (49) at Anzac Park. 
East Coast 17.8 (110) d Brighton 15.10 (100) at Lauderdale Oval. 
Sorell 20.19 (139) d Cygnet 9.10 (64) at Pembroke Park. 
Dodges Ferry 22.21 (153) d Huonville Lions 5.7 (37) at Shark Park.

Round 11
(Saturday, 28 June 2014) 
Hobart 16.5 (101) d Cygnet 11.18 (84) at Cygnet Oval. 
Dodges Ferry 10.11 (71) d Sorell 9.13 (67) at Pembroke Park. 
Lindisfarne 14.16 (100) d East Coast 15.9 (99) at Anzac Park. 
Claremont 22.16 (148) d Brighton 9.8 (62) at Abbotsfield Park. 
New Norfolk 32.22 (214) d Huonville Lions 4.3 (27) at Boyer Oval.

Round 12
(Saturday, 5 July 2014) 
New Norfolk 29.19 (193) d Brighton 6.8 (44) at Pontville Oval. 
Claremont 23.14 (152) d Dodges Ferry 6.7 (43) at Shark Park. 
Sorell 18.8 (116) d Hobart 11.9 (75) at TCA Ground. 
Lindisfarne 22.23 (155) d Huonville Lions 9.2 (56) at Huonville Recreation Ground. 
East Coast 15.27 (117) d Cygnet 10.13 (73) at Triabunna Recreation Ground.

Round 13
(Saturday, 12 July 2014) 
Claremont 38.27 (255) d Hobart 1.0 (6) at TCA Ground.* 
New Norfolk 39.23 (257) d Cygnet 1.2 (8) at Cygnet Oval.* 
Lindisfarne 16.23 (119) d Sorell 3.5 (23) at Anzac Park. 
Dodges Ferry 8.16 (64) d Brighton 4.8 (32) at Pontville Oval. 
East Coast 16.8 (104) d Huonville Lions 10.12 (72) at Huonville Recreation Ground. 
Note: This round saw both Hobart and Cygnet Football Club's greatest ever losses and lowest ever scores in SFL football.

Round 14
(Saturday, 19 July 2014) 
New Norfolk 17.14 (116) d Lindisfarne 7.15 (57) at Boyer Oval. 
Claremont 32.12 (204) d Cygnet 4.10 (34) at Abbotsfield Park. 
Brighton 15.11 (101) d Sorell 5.12 (42) at Pembroke Park. 
Hobart 20.13 (133) d Huonville Lions 11.8 (74) at TCA Ground. 
East Coast 21.12 (138) d Dodges Ferry 5.10 (40) at Shark Park.

Round 15
(Saturday, 26 July 2014) 
New Norfolk 22.13 (145) d East Coast 11.4 (70) at Lauderdale Oval. 
Claremont 19.20 (134) d Lindisfarne 7.7 (49) at Anzac Park. 
Brighton 23.16 (154) d Hobart 7.8 (50) at Pontville Oval. 
Dodges Ferry 13.9 (87) d Cygnet 3.8 (26) at Kermandie Oval.* 
Sorell 18.21 (129) d Huonville Lions 6.10 (46) at Huonville Recreation Ground. 
Note: Cygnet played their home fixture at Kermandie Oval, the former home of Kermandie Football Club.

Round 16
(Saturday, 2 August 2014) 
New Norfolk 40.24 (264) d Hobart 3.5 (23) at TCA Ground.* 
Claremont 43.18 (276) d Huonville Lions 2.1 (13) at Abbotsfield Park.* 
East Coast 9.18 (72) d Sorell 5.11 (41) at Pembroke Park. 
Brighton 24.8 (152) d Cygnet 6.9 (45) at Pontville Oval. 
Dodges Ferry 15.15 (105) d Lindisfarne 6.13 (49) at Shark Park 
Note: Hobart concedes their all-time highest score against them. New Norfolk's score is the highest score recorded in senior football at the TCA Ground in any competition spanning more than 100 years. 
Huonville Lions concede their all-time highest score against them and all-time record margin of defeat.

Round 17
(Saturday, 9 August 2014) 
New Norfolk 36.30 (246) d Sorell 2.2 (14) at Boyer Oval. 
Lindisfarne 19.17 (131) d Cygnet 7.8 (50) at Cygnet Oval. 
Dodges Ferry 16.19 (115) d Hobart 12.17 (89) at Shark Park 
Claremont 12.17 (89) d East Coast 10.12 (72) at Triabunna Recreation Ground. 
Brighton 17.16 (118) d Huonville Lions 3.7 (25) at Huonville Recreation Ground.

Round 18
(Saturday, 16 August 2014) 
New Norfolk 23.16 (154) d Dodges Ferry 4.4 (28) at Boyer Oval. 
Lindisfarne 19.18 (132) d Brighton 8.14 (62) at Anzac Park. 
East Coast 25.18 (168) d Hobart 4.9 (33) at TCA Ground. 
Claremont 21.12 (138) d Sorell 8.8 (56) at Abbotsfield Park. 
Huonville Lions 12.14 (86) d Cygnet 7.9 (51) at Huonville Recreation Ground.

Elimination Final
(Saturday, 23 August 2014) 
Dodges Ferry: 0.5 (5) | 1.6 (12) | 7.7 (49) | 9.9 (63) 
East Coast: 0.2 (2) | 3.7 (25) | 5.9 (39) | 7.11 (53) 
Attendance: N/A at Lauderdale Oval.

Qualifying Final
(Saturday, 23 August 2014) 
Lindisfarne: 1.5 (11) | 1.5 (11) | 7.7 (49) | 14.10 (94) 
Claremont: 2.0 (12) | 5.6 (36) | 7.8 (50) | 11.11 (77) 
Attendance: N/A at Abbotsfield Park.

First Semi Final
(Saturday 30 August 2014) 
Claremont: 5.6 (36) | 5.13 (43) | 8.19 (67) | 15.22 (112) 
Dodges Ferry: 1.5 (11) | 3.7 (25) | 3.11 (29) | 4.12 (36) 
Attendance: N/A at Abbotsfield Park.

Second Semi Final
(Saturday, 30 August 2014) 
New Norfolk: 4.3 (27) | 10.11 (71) | 16.15 (111) | 21.16 (142) 
Lindisfarne: 1.0 (6) | 1.1 (7) | 4.1 (25) | 7.3 (45) 
Attendance: N/A at Boyer Oval.

Preliminary Final
(Saturday, 6 September 2014) 
Claremont: 2.2 (14) | 7.5 (47) | 9.8 (62) | 11.10 (76) 
Lindisfarne: 3.5 (23) | 6.6 (42) | 9.7 (61) | 11.7 (73) 
Attendance: N/A at KGV Football Park.

Grand Final
(Saturday, 13 September 2014) 
New Norfolk: 4.0 (24) | 11.2 (68) | 23.4 (142) | 28.9 (177) 
Claremont: 7.2 (44) | 8.5 (53) | 8.6 (54) | 14.10 (94) 
Attendance: 3,900 at KGV Football Park.

External links 
 Official League Website (2014)

2014
2014 in Australian rules football